Open PHACTS (Open Pharmacological Concept Triple Store) was a European initiative public–private partnership between academia, publishers, enterprises, pharmaceutical companies and other organisations working to enable better, cheaper and faster drug discovery. It has been funded by the Innovative Medicines Initiative, selected as part of three projects to "design methods for common standards and sharing of data for more efficient drug development and patient treatment in the future".

Partnerships
A total of 27 partners were involved including:
 Academia: Maastricht University, University of Santiago de Compostela, University of Vienna, University of Manchester, University of Bonn, Swiss Institute of Bioinformatics, European Bioinformatics Institute, Vrije Universiteit of Amsterdam, Technical University of Denmark, University of Hamburg
 Pharmaceutical companies: Pfizer, Merck KGaA, Eli Lilly and Company, Novartis, GlaxoSmithKline, AstraZeneca
 Other companies: ChemSpider, Biovia, Eagle Genomics, Entagen
 Publishers: Royal Society of Chemistry, Thomson Reuters

Drug discovery
The Open Pharmacological Space created by the consortium intended to support open innovation and in-house non-public drug discovery research by removing bottlenecks in drug development. Resources from the project are publicly available on GitHub.

To reduce the barriers to drug discovery in industry, academia and for small businesses, the Open PHACTS consortium built the Open PHACTS Discovery Platform. This platform was freely available, integrating pharmacological data from a variety of information resources and providing tools and services to question this integrated data to support pharmacological research.

References

Information technology organizations based in Europe
Drug discovery
Medical databases